The 2010–11 season is Hartlepool United's 102nd season in existence and their fourth consecutive season in League One since promotion in 2006–07. Along with competing in League One, the club will also participate in the FA Cup, League Cup and League Trophy. The season covers the period from 1 July 2010 to 30 June 2011.

Players

Current squad

Transfers

Transfers in

Transfers out

Results

League One

League table

Results summary

Results by matchday

Results

FA Cup

Football League Cup

Football League Trophy

References

Hartlepool United F.C. seasons
Hartlepool United
2010s in County Durham